Psalm 94 is the 94th psalm in the biblical Book of Psalms. In the slightly different numbering system of the Greek Septuagint and Latin Vulgate versions of the Bible, this psalm is Psalm 93. In the King James Version its opening words are "O Lord God, to whom vengeance belongeth; O God, to whom vengeance belongeth, shew thyself" (in Hebrew ).

This psalm is referred to as one of the Royal Psalms, Psalms 93–99, praising God as the King of His people, although as Gordon Churchyard notes, God is referred to here as judge rather than king.

Alexander Kirkpatrick divides it into two sections. In the first section, up to verse 11, the psalmist calls on God "to manifest Himself as judge of the earth", while "the second part of the Psalm is occupied with thoughts of consolation for times of trouble".

Uses

Judaism
Is recited in its entirety, along with the first three verses of Psalm 95, as the psalm of the day for the Shir Shel Yom of Wednesday.
Is recited on the fifth day of Sukkot.
Verse 1 is part of Mishnah Tamid 7:4.
Verse 1-2 are the sixth and seventh verses of V'hu Rachum in Pesukei Dezimra.
Verse 14 is the sixteenth verse of Yehi Kivod in Pesukei Dezimra.

New Testament
Verse 11 is quoted in 1 Corinthians .
Verse 14 is quoted in Romans  .

Music
Franz Liszt's student Julius Reubke wrote a massive Sonata on the 94th Psalm for organ.  It is a staple of the organ repertoire.

Literature
Israeli historian Dina Porat titled her book about the Nakam group which sought revenge for the Holocaust "Vengeance and Retribution are Mine" to express her belief that humans should leave revenge for God.

References

External links 

 in Hebrew and English - Mechon-mamre
 King James Bible - Wikisource

094